The Saiyuki manga comprises five separate series. 
The chapters of the manga series are written and illustrated by Kazuya Minekura and have been serialized in Square Enix's in the manga magazine Monthly GFantasy 
since its March 1997 issue to December 2001. The book It will be one of the signboard works of "G Fantasy" and consists of nine volumes (55 chapters in total). 
Ichijinsha released First edition published in Monthly Comic Zero Sum magazine, all nine volume from October 26, 2002, to June 25, 2003. The series follows Genjyo Sanzo, is a Buddhist priest in the city of Shangri-La, which is being ravaged by yokai spirits that have fallen out of balance with the natural order. His superiors send him on a journey far to the west to discover why this is happening and how to stop it. His companions are three yokai with human souls. But this is no day trip—the four will encounter many discoveries and horrors on the way, and on the road.

A special edition title "Saiyuki Anthology" Released in Ichijinsha's Special Comic Zero Sum on July 24, 2010.

In 2015 a new edition of all nine Volumes of "Saiyuki" has been published by Ichijinsha.

The first English License was Tokyopop published all nine volumes of the manga from 2004 to 2005. beginning in 2020 Kodansha Comics is re-releasing Minekura's Saiyuki manga in 400-page hardcover volumes with new translations. The company released the second volume physically and digitally on August 18. Also Madman Entertainment releases Saiyuki (Manga) The Original Series - Resurrected Edition on March 13, 2020. The manga releases in North American From February 20, 2020, to January 23, 2021.

Saiyuki Gaiden
The manga have been serialized in Enix's Monthly GFantasy from 1999 to 2002, and Ichijinsha's Monthly Comic Zero Sum Resume the series since May 2002. 
The first volume released by Enix on December 1, 2000. The new edition of first volume released by the Ichijinsha on December 28, 2005.
Gaiden work, It is a story of an era that dates back 500 years from the main story, 
the manga on hold for one year in 2004.

Three volumes have been published until May, The final chapter released on May 16, 2009.

The final volume, Volume four had been released on July 25, 2009. In January, 2011, New Edition of "Saiyuki Gaiden" was published by ichijinsha and the two Volume released on January 25.

A Special edition named "Saiyuki Gaiden memorial"was also released on July 16, 2009. In September, 2012, new series "Tenjou no Ari" from "Saiyuki Gaiden" will be released as a one-shot.

"Saiyuki Gaiden: Tenjou no Ari" is the story of the first platoon of the heavenly western army led by Tenpou and Souko.

Saiyuki Reload
Started in 2002 in the monthly comic Zero Sum. Up ten volumes have been published, The final volume are released on September 25. On September 27, 2010, Ichijinsha's Monthly Comic Zero Sum magazine has announced that Saiyuki manga creator Kazuya Minekura is putting her manga serial work on indefinite hiatus due to her poor health.

In September 2015, a new edition of ten Volumes of "Saiyuki Reload" has been published by Ichijinsha.

Tokyopop has published Saiyuki Reload manga in North America.

Saiyuki Ibun
After the completion of "Saiyuki Gaiden", a new Gaiden "Saiyuki Ibun", The manga is a series depicting the youth of Koumyou Sanzo, the character of the "Saiyuki" series, the teacher of Xuanzang. Candidate monks challenge penance in order to obtain the inheritance right of "Sanzou Houshi". It was serialized in Zero-Sum Ward Ichijinsha from September 2009, but it was temporarily suspended due to poor physical condition of Minekura. In the same magazine released in November 2012, the serialization was resumed for the first time in 2 years and 4 months. Volume One released on March 25, 2013.

Saiyuki Reload Blast
The final chapter of the "Saiyuki" series that has continued since 1997. The serialization started from the February 2010 issue of the monthly comic Zero-Sum (Ichijinsha), and is currently serialized every other month in the same magazine. After a year and a half of Minekura's writing break, "Saiyuki Reload Bkast" serialization resumed from March. Volume One was released on July 25, 2012. On June 25, also a limited edition with a mini art book of Volume One has been released.

On July 27, 2013, Saiyuki Reload Blast Manga Slow Down Due to Creator's Health. Ichijinsha published the manga's second volume on July 25, 2014. In April 2016 Saiyuki Reload Blast Manga Goes on Hiatus Because Kazuya Minekura, the manga's author, is suffering from poor health, and put the manga on hiatus. On July 13, 2017, revealed that The third compiled volume of Kazuya Minekura's Saiyuki Reload Blast manga is slated to ship on August 31. It will be the first compiled volume for the series since the second volume shipped in July 2014. A special edition with an all-color illustration and sketch booklet has been also released. The Series went on hiatus in October 2017 and Resumes After 18-Month Hiatus. Volume 3 regular and special editions has been released on October 31, 2017.

The first English License was Tokyopop published all nine volumes of the manga from 2004 to 2005. beginning in 2020 Kodansha Comics is re-releasing Minekura's Saiyuki manga in 400-page hardcover volumes with new translations. The company released the second volume phsyically and digitally on August 18. Also Madman Entertainment releases Saiyuki (Manga) The Original Series - Resurrected Edition on March 13, 2020.

In 2020, Kodansha US released new translation in 4 omnibus volumes, titled Saiyuki: The Original Series Resurrected Edition, The manga has also get as well as five television anime series, an anime film, and three OVA series.

Volume list
Saiyuki (Enix Edition)

Saiyuki (Ichijinsha Edition)

Saiyuki (Ichijinsha New Edition)

Saiyuki Anthology

Saiyuki Gaiden (Enix Edition)

Saiyuki Gaiden (Ichijinsha Edition)

Saiyuki Gaiden (Ichijinsha New Edition)

Saiyuki Gaiden Anthology

Saiyuki Reload (Ichijinsha Edition)

Saiyuki Reload (Ichijinsha New Edition)

Saiyuki Ibun

Saiyuki Reload Blast

Saiyuki Reload Blast (Two Limited Edition, One Special) 

Saiyuki Reload Blast Anthology

Novels
Movie version Gensoumaden Saiyuuki-Requiem for the Unselected (G Fantasy Novels)

Kazuya Minekura,  Kiyoshi Misagi (Author) "Saiyuki" Ichijinsha Zero-sum Novels

Related books

Saiyuki Character Book

Original Perfect Guide "Saiyuki" Series

References

External links

Official/ "Saiyuki" CD official website 
"World is Mine -mine- website 
 "Saiyuki Reload Blast website 
 "Minekura.net website 

Saiyuki (manga)
Saiyuki